John W. Beard (born November 4, 1951, in Decorah, Iowa)  is a Democratic politician, representing the 16th District in the Iowa House of Representatives since 2008.  Beard lost his campaign for re-election to Bob Hager in 2010.  Beard is currently the Democratic candidate for Senate District 28, which after redistricting, included part of the old House District 16.  The Senate seat does not have an incumbent.

Early life and education
Beard was raised in Bedminster, New Jersey. He attended Rutgers University and the University of Miami.

Career
Along with being a politician, Beard is also the owner and operator of Beard Welding and Machine.

Organizations
He is a member in the following organizations:
Winneshiek County Conservation Board
Trout Unlimited
Pheasants Forever

Family
Beard is married to his wife RoJene and together they have two sons, a daughter, and two grandchildren.

References

External links
Representative John Beard official Iowa General Assembly site
John Beard State Representative official constituency site
 

Democratic Party members of the Iowa House of Representatives
1951 births
Living people
People from Decorah, Iowa
People from Bedminster, New Jersey